Lake Isle is an unincorporated community in central Alberta, Canada within Lac Ste. Anne County.

History 
Lake Isle was developed on the Yellowhead Trail fur trade route between Lac Ste. Anne and Jasper.  The first school opened at Lake Isle in 1913 and burned in 1920.  A new school was built and used until school consolidation in 1947. The first store was opened in 1915 by freighter and storekeeper, Ted Bigland.  The Canadian Northern Railway was built along the Yellowhead route.  Lake Isle is primarily a farming and ranching community, with cottages along the lake shore.

Notable people 
Donald Macleod (October 28, 1878 – April 15, 1957) (Alberta politician) - elected 1930 as a member of the Legislative Assembly  and served until 1935.  Farmed in the Lake Isle area.

References 

Localities in Lac Ste. Anne County